Mabruk is the first LP of Sahrawi singer Aziza Brahim, after her 2008 EP Mi Canto. The album is accompanied by a 16-page booklet which includes French translation of the songs, and a text by Sahrawi writer Bahia Mahmud Awah on the history of their people. It was elected as 2012 World Music Album of the Year by the Dutch magazine Heaven.

Track listing

References

2012 albums
Aziza Brahim albums
Spanish-language albums